Pierre Lemoyne (16 April 1891 – 30 July 1983) was a French equestrian. He competed in the team jumping event at the 1920 Summer Olympics.

References

External links
 

1891 births
1983 deaths
French male equestrians
Olympic equestrians of France
Equestrians at the 1920 Summer Olympics
People from Mont-de-Marsan
Sportspeople from Landes (department)